Gilbert Gruss born February 10, 1943, in Algrange, France and died on October 1, 2016, is a multiple winner of international karate tournaments.

References

External Links

School Karate Traditional Gilbert Gruss

1943 births
2016 deaths
French male karateka
People from Lorraine
20th-century French people
21st-century French people